The Old National Park Service Housing Historic District in Bryce Canyon National Park represents the first housing development within the park specifically designed to house National Park Service employees. Most of these units were intended for unmarried seasonal employees, and were small in scale.  The majority were built  between 1932 and 1936.  Plans were developed by the Park Service Branch of Plans and Design. The district includes several cabins, a ranger dormitory, and a "wood vendor" structure.

References

National Register of Historic Places in Bryce Canyon National Park
Park buildings and structures on the National Register of Historic Places in Utah
Historic districts on the National Register of Historic Places in Utah
Houses in Utah
Residential buildings on the National Register of Historic Places in Utah
Rustic architecture in Utah
1932 establishments in Utah
National Register of Historic Places in Garfield County, Utah